Buddy and Towser is a 1934 American Warner Bros. Looney Tunes cartoon directed by Friz Freleng. The cartoon was released on February 24, 1934, and features Buddy, the second star of the series.

Summary
Buddy enlists his dog, Towser, to guard his award-winning chickens. A fox penetrates Buddy's property as Towser and Buddy sleep, but the chickens, initially, are able to repel the fox by throwing their eggs at it. In its escape, the fox awakens Towser, who proceeds to bark, awakening his owner, and chase the fox.

Towser is joined in the chase by Buddy, who now wields a shotgun (that he is humorously unable to handle.) Eventually, Buddy and Towser run up a snowy hill after the fox, which then crashes into a tree, tumbles backwards, and finds itself trapped in an increasingly large snowball, which soon envelops Towser and Buddy. At the foot of the hill, the snowball breaks apart on impact with a shed, leaving Buddy, Towser, and the fox momentarily dazed.

Coming to their senses, Buddy and Towser each take a plank of wood and aim to hit the fox, which sits between them; but the fox comes to and scurries away, leaving Buddy to accidentally whack Towser, and vice versa, as the cartoon ends.

References

External links
 
 

1934 films
1934 animated films
American black-and-white films
Animated films about dogs
Animated films about foxes
Films scored by Norman Spencer (composer)
Short films directed by Friz Freleng
Buddy (Looney Tunes) films
Looney Tunes shorts
Warner Bros. Cartoons animated short films
1930s Warner Bros. animated short films